Lukas Herzog may refer to:

 Lukas Herzog (basketball), German basketball player
 Lukas Herzog (ice hockey), Austrian ice hockey player